Transmembrane protein 109 is a protein that in humans is encoded by the TMEM109 gene.

References

Further reading